Maignan is a French surname. Notable people with the surname include:

Albert Maignan (1845–1908), French painter and illustrator
Emmanuel Maignan (1601–1676), French physicist and Catholic theologian
Gilles Maignan (born 1968), French cyclist
Mike Maignan (born 1995), French association football player

See also
Maignan Point in Antarctica

French-language surnames